Roger Feghali 

(born 20 September 1973 in Wadi Chahrour, Lebanon) is a Lebanese rally driver, he is 15 times Lebanese Rally champion  and the record holder of wins (15) in Rally of Lebanon (part of MERC).

Roger runs his own team, Motortune Racing , for rally car preparation and management.

Palmares
15 Times Lebanese Rally Champion: 97–98–99–2000–07–08–09–10–11-12-13-15-17-18-21
15 Times Winner of Rally of Lebanon (MERC): 2000–03–04–06–07–08–09–10–11-12-13-15-17-18-21
Winner of Rally d'Antibes 2015 (French Rally Championship)
6 times Lebanese Hill Climb champion 2015, 2016, 2017, 2019, 2020 and 2021
2nd Overall in Rally of Lebanon 1999 and Jordan Rally 2009, 2012 and 2013 and Troodos Rally 2009 (MERC) and Cyprus Rally 2010 (MERC/IRC) and 2016 (MERC)
Winner of 2011 Red Bull Ras B Ras competition (ME ROC)
Winner of Toyota Race of middle east Champions: 2001–2002
Winner of 2007 and 2013-14 Tal el Rumman Hill Climb (Jordan)
Winner of 42 Lebanese local rallies: 
 Rally du Printemps: 97–99–2000–04–07–08–09–10–11-12-14-15-17-18-21-22
 Rally des Cedres: 1997–99–2000–06–07–08–09–10-11-12-14-17-19 
 Ronde Hivernal: 97–98–99–2000–04 
 Rally Jezzine: 2012-13-14-15-18-19-21-22
Winner of 14 Jordanian Local Rallies
2nd Overall & 1st Grp N 2001 Rally Elpa Halkidikis (ERC)
2nd Grp N - 2001 Rally Catalogne (WRC)
3rd Grp 1600 - 2002 Rally Monte Carlo (WRC)
Winner of 23 lebanese Hill Climbs:
 Deir el Qamar International Hill Climb (ME championship): 2007 
 Deir el Qamar: 2017 
 Falougha: 2014-15 
 Arsoun: 2016-18 
 Baabdat: 2016-17-19 
 Bkessine: 2015-16
 Roumieh: 2017
 Medyar: 2018-22
 Mraijat: 2019-20-21-22
 Wadi Chahrour: 2019-21-22
 Hasbaya: 2020-21
Winner Michelin Trophy (and S2000 class) in Rallye du Rouergue 2014 (French Rally Championship)
Winner of Shiraz Rally 2014 (MERC candidate)
 3 times Lebanese Speed Test champion 2018-19-21

References

External links
 Motortune Racing  – Official website
  Roger Feghali's profile at RallyBase.nl
  Roger Feghali's profile at ewrc-results.com
  at 
 2001 - Feghali wins Toyota Race of Champions - https://gulfnews.com/uae/feghali-wins-toyota-race-of-champions-1.422000
 2015 - VIDEO: Lebanese rally driver Roger Feghali drifts through villagehttps://lebaneseexaminer.com/2015/06/14/video-lebanese-rally-driver-roger-feghali-drifts-through-mt-lebanon-village/
 2015 - ...Et de douze pour Roger Feghali https://www.lorientlejour.com/article/942846/et-de-douze-pour-roger-feghali.html
 2016 - Roger Feghali – Lancer Evo Driver https://www.universitymitsubishi.com/roger-feghali-lancer-evo-driver/
 2017-  Le fameux pilote Roger Feghali est sans aucun doute l’icône du sport automobile local https://magazine.com.lb/2017/04/06/roger-feghali-2/
 2018 - The Fabulous Feghalis: Lebanon’s Legendary Rallying Brothers https://www.skoda-motorsport.com/en/the-fabulous-feghalis-lebanons-legendary-rallying-brothers/
 2019 - Al Attiyah Close to Creating History in Rally Lebanon https://www.albawaba.com/sport/al-attiyah-close-creating-history-rally-lebanon-1305915
 2021 - Roger Feghali 15 times Rally of Lebanon Champion  https://al-akhbar.com/Sport_Lebanon/316130 - https://wheelz.me/atcl-2021-rol-results/

Rally drivers
Lebanese racing drivers
Living people
1973 births
World Rally Championship drivers
Lebanese Christians